Sandusky Central Catholic School is a Catholic, private school in Sandusky, Ohio. Founded in 1902, it is administered by the Roman Catholic Diocese of Toledo.

Mission
A faith community committed to: 
Following Jesus
Living the Gospel by
Strengthening the body
Challenging the mind
Enriching the spirit
Forming future leaders for the Church and community

School Traditions
Kairos Retreat - Each year seniors attend an off-site 4 day retreat to become closer to God and to form a community amongst each other.  This retreat is to learn more about one's self...as children of God.

School system combination
Three area Catholic schools combined in 2003: Holy Angels, Sts. Peter and Paul, and St. Mary. The school's Superintendent became Sr. Mary Jon Wagner. Originally the school's new name was to be Trinity Catholic School. Since then the entire school system has become Sandusky Central Catholic Schools, and the High School Campus has remained St. Mary Central Catholic.

Ohio High School Athletic Association State Championships

 Boys Basketball – 1936, 1980 
 Boys Wrestling – 1994, 2000, 2002, 2003, 2004, 2005, 2006
 Girls Cross Country – 1987, 1988, 1989, 1990 
 Boys Swimming - 2010
 Panther's wrestling tradition started back in 1976 when they had their first champion Joe Dye

Notable alumni
 Bob Brotzki, former NFL player

Sandusky River League
On February 1, 2013, St. Mary announced they would be forming a new league called the Sandusky River League in 2014–15 with Tiffin Calvert, Lakota, New Riegel, Old Fort, and Fremont St. Joe's.  This league ultimately gave a home to the remaining MAL schools.  However, the SRL was absorbed by the Sandusky Bay Conference in 2016–17, bringing the Panthers back into their traditional league home where they compete in the River Division.

References

External links
 School Website

Catholic secondary schools in Ohio
Educational institutions established in 1902
High schools in Erie County, Ohio
1902 establishments in Ohio